James Timothy DuBois (born May 4, 1948 is a Certified Public Accountant (CPA) and a Nashville-based songwriter and recording industry executive who has headed both Arista Records (Nashville Division) and Universal South Records. As a songwriter he wrote five No. 1 country hits. His most successful song was the world-wide hit "Love in the First Degree" recorded by the group Alabama.

DuBois' started playing guitar in bands as a youth. He received three academic scholarships to Oklahoma State University to study accounting; he earned two advanced degrees and became a senior financial analyst for the Texas Federal Reserve Bank, as well as worked for Arthur Anderson.  While pursuing his PhD., DuBois became interested in country music and began writing songs, eventually leading him to move to Nashville to pursue music. Writing successful songs  led to his becoming a record producer, creating over 20 No. 1 and top five singles and more than a dozen gold, platinum, and double-platinum country albums. In 1984, he created the musical group Restless Heart. He was tapped by Clive Davis to create a Nashville office of Arista Records in 1989. He discovered and signed country artists Alan Jackson, Brooks & Dunn, Brad Paisley, Blackhawk, Pam Tillis and Diamond Rio.

DuBois was recognized as the "most powerful person in the music industry" by Business Nashville in 1996, "Record Executive of the year" in 1992 by Pollstar, and was included in Entertainment Weekly’s list of the "101 Most Powerful People in Entertainment" in 1994 and 1995. He is a member of the Oklahoma State University's Hall of Fame (1996) and was the school's Accounting Alumnus of the year (1992).

Early career
Born in Southwest City, Missouri, Dubois played guitar in rock bands as a youth.  His senior year in high school a camp roommate wrote a song; DuBois was fascinated with song lyrics and felt he could write a song himself. His interest in songs (especially lyrics) continued for the rest of his life, but his academic studies were his immediate goal. He attended Oklahoma State University and studied accounting, winning three scholarships: an Arthur Andersen Scholarship, an Atlantic Richfield Scholarship and an Oklahoma State Regents Scholarship. He received a bachelor's in accounting in 1971 and a master's in 1972, and became a CPA. He worked for the Arthur Andersen Firm for about a year then took a job in Dallas as a Financial Analyst for the Texas Federal Reserve Bank. During his time in Texas, he became interested in country music, and pursued songwriting in his spare time. Attending an accounting convention in Dallas he met up with some of his former professors who convinced him to return to Oklahoma State to enter the PhD program at OSU's Spears School of Business. While in the PhD program, music fascinated him and consumed his time. He said, "I'm a true left brain, right brain conflict but it has served me very well". He made trips to Nashville on weekends and he read every book he could find to learn about the business of songwriting. In 1975, he met Scott Hendricks, another Oklahoma State student. Dubois and Hendricks, along with DuBois' younger brother (also a musician) headed for Nashville.

DuBois wrote letters to many Nashville music industry people and a few agreed to meet with him. Among those was John Ragsdale, brother of Ray Stevens, and they became friends. DuBois stayed at Ragsdale's house on many occasions. They co-wrote "A Good Old Fashioned Saturday Night Honky Tonk Barroom Brawl" recorded by Vernon Oxford and the song went to No. 55 on the Billboard country charts. Energized by this success, DuBois took a leave of absence from His PhD studies and secured a job in Nashville teaching accounting at the University of Tennessee.

He taught night school, leaving the daytime free to knock on doors of music producers and publishers. In 1979, he was given his first job as a publishing company staff songwriter by Bob Montgomery for $75 a week. From 1979 to 1985, DuBois worked as both a publishing company staff writer and as an accounting professor.  Throughout that period, DuBois composed over 20 country singles. A pivotal year for him was 1980: that year he got a job teaching at Vanderbilt's Owen Graduate School of Management  and he had three hit songs on the country charts. These were: "Midnight Hauler" (Razzy Bailey); "Love in the First Degree" (Alabama") ; and   "She Got the Goldmine (I Got the Shaft)"(Jerry Reed);

DuBois opened the Nashville branch of Los Angeles-based artist management firm Fitzgerald-Hartley in 1986. Country artist Vince Gill soon joined the company's inaugural client, Restless Heart. DuBois and Gill collaborated on some songwriting projects including the Country Music Association's 1990 Song of the Year, "When I Call Your Name".

In 1989, Clive Davis, founder of Arista Records, appointed DuBois to open the Nashville division of the label. Arista Nashville sold 80 million albums in its first eleven years of business, breaking acts like Alan Jackson, Brooks & Dunn, Pam Tillis, Diamond Rio, and Brad Paisley. DuBois later joined producer Tony Brown to operate Universal South Records, launching the careers of Joe Nichols, Cross Canadian Ragweed, and Shooter Jennings.

In 1991, DuBois married Pamela Smith from Dallas, Texas, a friend he had known for fifteen years. Their daughter, Jamie Grace DuBois, was born in 1994.

Career today
In 2007, DuBois returned to the faculty of Vanderbilt's Owen Graduate School of Management, where he is developing courses related to the music business. He has also  joined forces with Marc Dottore to form Dottore-DuBois Artist Management.  DuBois resides in Nashville, Tennessee.

In February 2010, ASCAP announced they would elevate their Nashville outlet to a Regional Office, led by DuBois.  DuBois holds the position of Vice President and Managing Executive. After restructuring ASCAP, DuBois was asked to join London Broadcast Company in January 2012, based in Dallas, Texas.  He started
a joint-venture called AMP (Artists, Managers, Partners) which he is still managing.

Organizations
DuBois serves on the boards of the Country Music Association, Academy of Country Music, Americana Music Association, and SunTrust Bank, and as chairman of the Nashville Convention and Visitors Bureau. He is a past board member of Leadership Music, Country Music Foundation, National Academy of Recording Arts & Sciences, Nashville Songwriters Foundation, and Nashville Songwriters Association International.

Awards and recognition
Tim DuBois has been recognized as "Record Executive of the Year" by Pollstar, and as one of the entertainment industry's "101 Most Powerful People" by Entertainment Weekly. He was inducted into Oklahoma State University's Hall of Fame in 1996. Throughout his songwriting career, DuBois has earned five number-1 singles, 24 top-ten singles, six ASCAP Awards, nine BMI Country Awards, two BMI Pop Awards and a number of other songwriting accolades.

Songwriting awards

Discography

Record production credits

Song production credits

References

1948 births
Living people
American country songwriters
American male songwriters
Record producers from Missouri